Spinolia dallatorreana is a species of cuckoo wasps belonging to the subfamily Chrysidinae.

Subspecies
 Spinolia dallatorreana bicarinatus (Linsenmaier, 1959) 
 Spinolia dallatorreana dallatorreana (Mocsáry, 1896)

Ecology
The main host species of this parasitic wasp is a potter wasp, Hemipterochilus bembeciformis.

Distribution
This species can be found in Austria, France, Greece, Hungary, Slovakia, Spain and in the Near East.

Etymology
The species name honours Karl Wilhelm von Dalla Torre.

References 

Insects described in 1896
Taxa named by Alexander Mocsáry
Hymenoptera of Europe
Chrysidinae